Tim Dawson (born 1988) is a British writer and political activist, best known for his work on a number of television comedies.

Education
He was educated at Abingdon School from 1999 to 2006. During his time at school, he was the comedy actor in school productions of Here to Entertain You and The Comedians. He also wrote, produced and directed Bang Goes Douglas Smith.

Career
Dawson began his career in 2007 when his original sitcom, Coming of Age, was piloted by BBC Three. The show ran for three series and was panned by critics.

He also wrote on Series 7 and 8 of Two Pints of Lager and a Packet of Crisps. Dawson was identified as a "Broadcast Hot Shot" in a 2008 edition of the industry magazine Broadcast.

In 2016, Dawson and Two Pints creator Susan Nickson were rumoured to be working on a new Carry On film. 

In 2018, Dawson contributed an episode to Lady Christina, a series of audio dramas spun-off from Doctor Who and made by Big Finish Productions.

Dawson stood as a Conservative council candidate for the ward of Hulme in the 2018 Manchester City Council elections. He received 182 votes and came 6th, failing to win election.

In 2019, the Guardian newspaper reported that Dawson - a keen supporter of Brexit - was acting as the public face of the pro-Brexit organisation, Britain's Future.The organisation was the biggest single UK political advertiser on Facebook, spending £422,000 campaigning for a hard Brexit. The money was spent buying "dark ads" targeting anti-Brexit politicians. Dawson has refused to answer questions about who funded his campaign.

Not for Turning, a radio drama by Dawson, was broadcast on BBC Radio 4 in September 2020.

Dawson has written articles for The Daily Telegraph, The Spectator, The Critic, Spiked, and the British Comedy Guide.

Personal life

Dawson is bisexual.

See also
 List of Old Abingdonians

References

External links 
 

English television writers
Living people
1988 births
People educated at Abingdon School